Man is a Chinese variety show that airs on Hunan Television. The show is based on the South Korean series Real Men by MBC. The show is a large national defence education special program in the People's Republic of China. Season 1 began airing on May 1, 2015, Friday nights at 10:00 PM with 12 episodes total. Season 2 began airing on October 21, 2016 on Friday nights with 14 episodes total. Season 3 will start filming on June 18, 2017.

Cast

Season 1
The first season would start by enlisting 6 males in the People's Liberation Army Ground Force.
 Wang Baoqiang (badly hurt in Episode 5, returned to the troop in Episode 7)
 Zhang Fengyi
 Yuan Hong
 Guo Xiaodong
 Du Haitao
 Liu Haoran
 Oho Ou (first appeared in Episode 6)

Season 2
The second season differed from the first season by enlisting 4 females and 4 males in the People's Liberation Army Air Force. 
 Yang Mi
 Jiang Jinfu
 Sun Yang (left the troop in connection with swimming at the 2016 Summer Olympics#Men's events in Episode 2, returned in Episode 5)
 Huang Zitao
 Tong Liya
 Shen Mengchen
 Zhang Lanxin
 Li Rui

Season 3
Liu Tao
Jackson Yi 
Yang Zi
Zhang Tianai 
Huang Xuan
Zhu Yawen 
Wang Luodan
Zhang Dada

References

External links
  

2015 Chinese television series debuts
Chinese military television series
Chinese variety television shows
Chinese television series based on South Korean television series
Chinese-language television shows
Hunan Television original programming